Mohamed A.M. Ismail(born 24 November 1967) is a Vice President of the Egyptian State Council (Conseil d’Etat), Judge at the Egyptian Supreme Administrative Court, formerly Judge at the Court of Appeal (Contracts Circuit). He is a fellow of the Chartered Institute of Arbitrators (UK), Visiting Professor and PhD examiner at the British and Egyptian Universities and a  lecturer at the Cairo Regional Centre of the International Commercial Arbitration (CRCICA). He is the State Prize Laureate in Academic Legal Research for 2011/2012. The Prize, which is the highest in the MENA region since 1958, was granted to him by the Arab Republic of Egypt. Ismail is a lecturer at the Arab League and BCDR-AAA. He is also a member of the Comité Française d’Arbitrage.

Early life

Ismail was formerly a Senior Legal Advisor to HE the Egyptian Minister of Petroleum and represented the Egyptian government in state international business transactions in the oil and gas industry, especially in the United Kingdom, with law firms such as Shearman Sterling, the International Counsel to the Egyptian Government, as well as Baker McKenzie Egypt.

He was a Senior Legal Advisor to HE the Egyptian Minister of Trade and Industry and formerly a Senior Legal Advisor in the Investment Sector in Egypt and represented the Egyptian Government at the United Nations Conference on Trade and Development (UNCTAD), Geneva, for the Bilateral Investment Treaties (BITs) negotiations, where developing states were involved.

Ismail is currently a senior legal adviser at the Legislation and Legal Opinion Commission, Ministry of Justice, Kingdom of Bahrain. Ismail has widely published in the UK, Germany, and in the MENA region.

Publications
 Ismail, Mohamed A M, "International Investment Arbitration, Lessons from Developments in the MENA Region", Ashgate Publishing, UK, Europe, USA and Sydney.  (hbk).  (ebk – PDF).  (ebk – ePUB).
 Arab Constitutions‘ Current and Potential Challenges in the Arab Spring Revolutions Era'. A comparative Perspectives to Arab constitutions and European constitutions.   The book is published By El Halabi Publishing company in Beirut - Lebanon in 495 pages (in Arabic).
 Ismail, Mohamed AM, 'The International Administrative Contract and Arbitration in State Contracts' An analytical study to state contracts with private foreign entities in the light of the UNCITRAL Arbitration Rules as amended in 2010, the new ICC Rules of 2012, and the FIDIC Forms of Contracts. The Study is a comparative perspective with the Anglo-American jurisdiction.
 Ismail, Mohamed AM, 'Justice and Equality and its Effect to Maintain Citizenship in Arab Countries', Paper published at the First Arab Conference on the Development of the Culture of Law and National Awareness from 10 – 12 March 2013, Ar-rashid Hotel, Baghdad, Iraq. pp. 507–531.
 Ismail, Mohamed AM, 'Perspectives on the public interests and the Second Republic Era in Egypt', Thoughts about the current political and constitutional situation in Egypt and whether Samuel Huntington's vision regarding the Clash of Civilization is true or not? The book deals with constitutional law issues and international relations aspects.() (15294/2012)
 Ismail, Mohamed, Arab Arbitration Journal, December, The Law Journal of Cairo Regional Centre of International Commercial Arbitration(CRCICA), The Middle East Region, June, 2012, (in Arabic).
 Ismail, Mohamed " International Infrastructure Agreements and PPPs in Developing Countries: Substantive Principles "With Special Reference to Arab and Latin American Countries". The European Public Private Partnership Law Review, EPPPL, Berlin, Germany, 3/ 2011..
 Ismail, Mohamed, "Infrastructure Agreements and the Concerned Minister's Consent before starting Arbitration", Arab Arbitration Journal, December, The Law Journal of Cairo Regional Centre of International Commercial Arbitration(CRCICA), The Middle East Region, Dec. 2011,PP.171– 221, (in Arabic).
 Ismail, Mohamed A M, "Globalization and New International Public Works Agreements in Developing Countries "An Analytical Perspective", Ashgate Publishing, UK, Europe, USA and Sydney. The book is available in international markets since November 2011. The book deals with the influence of globalization to  'Le Contrat Administratif' and States' International Construction Contracts in developing countries in 15 chapters. ADR and International Arbitration are scrutinized in 6 chapters. A Foreword is written by HH Humphrey Lloyd QC. Endorsements were written by Prof. Christopher Bovis, University of Hull, UK, Professor Julian Lew, QC, Professor Yehyia El Gamal, Cairo University, and former Vice-Prime Minister in Egypt, till August, 2011( former minister 1974), and Professor Samir El Sharkawy, former Dean of Law School, Cairo University.  (hbk)  (ebk). A  "Book Review" was published at the International Construction Law Review, UK, INFORMA, July, 2012, by Professor Doug Jones.(Editor-in-Chief)-. Please visit: www.drmohamedismail.com
 Ismail, Mohamed, "  Globalisation and New Contractual Regime in the International Public works Agreements in Egypt " The International Construction Law Review, Editors-in-Chief HH Humphrey Lloyd, Q C and Mr. Douglas Jones, Informa, London, UK, July 2010..
 Ismail, Mohamed, "Globalization and Liquidated Damages in the Anglo-American Jurisdictions", in English, El Qanon Wel Eqtisad Law Journal, Cairo University Law Journal, Jan 2011. The leading authority in academia in the MENA region since 1930.Editorial Board consists of Cairo University Professors. (197/1975).
 Ismail, Mohamed "Legal Globalisation and PPPs in Egypt". The European Public Private Partnership Law Review, EPPPL (Germany), Editor -in –Chief Prof. Christopher Bovis, Berlin, Germany, 1/2010..
 Ismail, Mohamed "Globalisation and Contract Price in the Egyptian State Procurement Law, New Trends, ". The International Construction Law Review, Editors-in-chief HH Humphrey Lloyd, QC and Mr. Douglas Jones, Informa, London,UK, Jan 2010..
 Ismail, Mohamed "Public Economic Law and the New International Administrative Contract". A comparative and analytical study on the effect of cultural and legal globalization on the legal culture in Egypt in the domain of State international business transactions (legislation, litigation, and new transactions in Egypt such as PPP and BOOT Agreements). The book was published By El Halabi Publishing co in Beirut - Lebanon in 640 pages. in Arabic. (Available in all Arab market by 1 Dec 2009). The book was awarded the State Prize in Academic legal Research in the A.R.E, 2011/2012. This award is the highest award in the MENA region in academic research.
 Ismail, Mohamed "Globalisation and Liquidated Damages in International Public Works Agreements in Egypt, an Analytical Perspective on the Penalty for Delay Clause in Infrastructure Agreements". The International Construction Law Review, Editors-in-chief HH Humphrey Lloyd, QC and Mr. Douglas Jones, Informa, London, UK, Oct 2009..
 Ismail, Mohamed "New Perspectives on International Contracts and State Contracts" (2009). Published by El Halabi Publishing and Printing Co. Beirut - Lebanon. The book contains lectures in Arabic and in English delivered by the Author at the Cairo Regional Center for International Commercial Arbitration(CRCICA) on international construction contracts arbitration and oil and gas concession agreements. The book is 680 pages in Arabic and English. The book was awarded the State Prize in Academic legal Research in the A.R.E, 2011/2012. This award is the highest award in the MENA region in academic research.
 Ismail, Mohamed "International Construction Contracts Arbitration" (2003) Published by El Halabi Publishing and Printing Co. Beirut - Lebanon. The Book and Appendices are 840 pages (in Arabic). The latest version of the PhD thesis.
 Ismail, Mohamed. "Thoughts about the State Procurement Law and State Contracting". Paper submitted in Arabic at the State Contracts and Procurements Conference, Cairo,-Cairo Regional Center of International Arbitration(CRCICA).
 Ismail, Mohamed. "The New Role of the Second Parliament in Egypt". Article in El Ahram Newspaper, the widest circulating daily newspaper in Egypt and the Arab world. The article is dated 16 April 2001 (in Arabic).
 Ismail, Mohamed. "The New Role of the Egyptian Conseil d’Etat". Article in El Ahram News Paper, the widest circulating daily newspaper in Egypt and the Arab world. This article is dated 30 July 2001 (in Arabic).
 Ismail, Mohamed "International Construction Contracts Arbitrations". The New Legal hybrid Nature and its Impact on ' Le Contrat Administratif, PhD thesis. The thesis is published in Arabic, Cairo, in 478 pages. -  May, 2000.
 Ismail, Mohamed. "Multi Party Arbitration in International Construction Contracts". Paper submitted at the International Construction Contracts Conference held in Nile Hilton, Cairo, The Cairo Regional Center of International Arbitration (CRCICA), June 1996 .
 Many other papers (in English and Arabic) presented at many international conferences and seminars in the area of International Commercial Arbitration, International Investment Arbitration, International Infrastructure agreements, International Construction Contracts Arbitration, Arbitration in International Public Works Agreements in the Developing Countries, Constitutional Law Theory and Practice in Arab Countries, Comparative perspective with USA and European Constitutions(i.e. French Constitution of the Fifth Republic, 1958, German Constitution 1949 as amended in 2002), human rights in the Arab countries.  Dr Ismail has widely published with El Ahram News Paper,the widest circulating daily newspaper in Egypt and the Arab world, particularly in 2011, 2012, and 2013.

References

1967 births
20th-century Egyptian judges
Living people
21st-century Egyptian judges
Egyptian politicians
Academic staff of Cairo University